Nuclear fallout is the residual radiation hazard from a nuclear explosion.

Fallout, fall out or fall-out may also refer to:

Books
Fallout (novel), a 2010 novel by Ellen Hopkins
Fall Out, 1957 anti-nuclear study edited by Bertrand Russell
Fall-Out, the English translation of Gudrun Pausewang's novel Die Wolke, 1987
Fallout: An American Nuclear Tragedy

Film
 Fallout (2008 film), a 2008 British television drama film
 Fallout, a 2010 Polish film by Wilhelm Sasnal
 Fallout, a 2013 documentary on author Nevil Shute and the making of Stanley Kramer's On the Beach
 Mission: Impossible – Fallout, a 2018 American action film starring Tom Cruise
 The Fallout (2021 film), a 2021 American drama film

Television 
 Fallout (TV series), a 2006 Irish two-part docudrama
 Fallout (upcoming TV series), an upcoming Amazon Prime Video series based on the video game franchise of the same name

Episodes
 "Fallout" (AfterMASH)
 "The Fallout" (Arrested Development)
 "Fallout" (Arrow)
 "Fallout" (The Flash)
 "Fallout" (Haven)
 "Fallout" (Heroes)
 "Fallout" (Jericho)
 "Fallout" (NCIS: Los Angeles)
 "Fall Out" (The Prisoner)
 "Fallout" (Smallville)
 "The Fallout" (Smash)
 "Fallout" (Stargate SG-1)
 "Fallout" (Supergirl)

Games
Fallout (series), a video game series currently developed by Bethesda Game Studios
Fallout (video game), a 1997 video game and the first title in the series

Music
Fallout (band), a Brooklyn-based heavy metal band
Fallout Records, an English record label

Albums
Fallout (Front Line Assembly album), 2007
Fallout (The Mayfield Four album), 1998
The Fallout (Crown the Empire album), 2012
The Fallout (Default album), 2001
Fall Out, a 1968 album by Terry Smith

Songs
"Fallout" (Marianas Trench song), 2011
"Fallout" (Catfish and the Bottlemen song), 2014
"Fallout" (Masked Wolf song), 2022
"Fall Out" (song)", a 1977 song by The Police
"Fallout", a 2010 song by Alter Bridge from AB III
"Fallout", a 2010 song by Linkin Park from A Thousand Suns
"The Fallout", a 2006 song by The Haunted from The Dead Eye
"Fallout", a 2011 song by Neon Indian from Era Extraña

Other
Bird fallout, the result of severe weather on migrating birds
Microarchitectural Data Sampling, also called Fallout, a computer microprocessor vulnerability
Deposition (aerosol physics), the process by which aerosol particles collect or deposit themselves on solid surfaces

See also
 Falling out (disambiguation)